These are the results of the boxing competition at the 1928 Summer Olympics in Amsterdam.  Medals were awarded in eight weight classes. The competitions were held from 7 to 12 August.

Participating nations
A total of 144 boxers from 29 nations competed at the Amsterdam Games:

Medal summary

Medal table

References

External links
 Boxing at the 1928 Amsterdam Summer Games. sports-reference.com
 International Olympic Committee medal database
 Amateur Boxing

 
1928 Summer Olympics events
1928
1928 in boxing

ro:Box la Jocurile Olimpice din 1924